Bernarda Brčić (born ) is a Croatian female volleyball player. She is a member of the Croatia women's national volleyball team and plays for RC Cannes since 2020.

She was part of the Croatian national team at the 2014 FIVB Volleyball Women's World Championship in Italy.

Clubs
  ŽOK Rijeka (2009–2013)
  Tiboni Urbino (2013–2014)
  ES Le Cannet (2014–2015)
  Neruda Volley (2015–2016)
  CSM Târgoviște (2016–2017)
  OK Kostrena (2017)
  Calcit Volleyball (2017–present)

References

External links
http://italy2014.fivb.org/en/competition/teams/cro-croatia/players/bernarda-brcic?id=41667
http://worldgrandprix.2016.fivb.com/en/group3/competition/teams/cro-croatia/players/bernarda-brcic?id=51145
http://www.scoresway.com/?sport=volleyball&page=player&id=6419
http://www.cev.lu/competition-area/PlayerDetails.aspx?TeamID=9730&PlayerID=4254&ID=837
http://www.legavolleyfemminile.it/?page_id=194&idat=BRI-BER-91

1991 births
Living people
Croatian women's volleyball players
Sportspeople from Osijek
Croatian expatriate sportspeople in Italy
Croatian expatriate sportspeople in France
Croatian expatriate sportspeople in Romania
Croatian expatriate sportspeople in Slovenia
Setters (volleyball)
Expatriate volleyball players in Italy
Expatriate volleyball players in France
Expatriate volleyball players in Romania
Expatriate volleyball players in Slovenia
Mediterranean Games gold medalists for Croatia
Mediterranean Games bronze medalists for Croatia
Mediterranean Games medalists in volleyball
Competitors at the 2013 Mediterranean Games
Competitors at the 2018 Mediterranean Games
Croatian expatriate volleyball players